Arches is a commune in the Cantal department in south-central France.

Geography
The Sumène forms the commune's northeastern border, then flows into the Dordogne, which forms the commune's northern and western border.

Population

See also
Communes of the Cantal department

References

Communes of Cantal